Phil Young is an American Democratic Party politician currently serving as a member of the Connecticut House of Representatives from the 120th district, which includes part of Stratford, since 2018. Young was first elected in 2018 during a special election against Republican Bill Cabral. In that year's general election, Young defeated Republican Jim Feehan by just 13 votes. Young defeated Feehan again in 2020 by a 2.6 point margin. In February 2022, Young announced that he will seek re-election in the upcoming November 2022 election. Young currently serves as a member of the house's Judiciary Committee, Public Health Committee, and the Environment Committee.

References

Living people
People from Stratford, Connecticut
Democratic Party members of the Connecticut House of Representatives
Year of birth missing (living people)